Wham! Bam! Islam! is a 2011 PBS documentary by Isaac Solotaroff broadcast in October that year as the season premiere of PBS's series "Independent Lens".

The documentary follows Naif Al-Mutawa, creator of the comic book The 99 and the animated TV-series The 99 and was pitched at the 2009 Sheffield Doc/Fest MeetMarket.

References

External links 
 

2010s English-language films
American documentary television films
2011 television films
2011 films
Documentary films about Islam in the United States
2010s American films